LP! is the fourth studio album by American rapper JPEGMafia. Released on his 32nd birthday, October 22, 2021, this is JPEGMafia's final studio album released with Republic Records and EQT Recordings. LP! has two versions, an "online" version which was the version released on streaming services and an "offline" version which was released on YouTube, SoundCloud, and Bandcamp, featuring a slightly different tracklist due to sample-related issues. The album includes guest appearances from DatPiffMafia, Tkay Maidza, and Denzel Curry (online version only).

Upon release, LP! received acclaim among music critics and publications, with some critics naming the offline version of the album as JPEGMafia's best album.

Track listing
All tracks written and produced by JPEGMafia, except "Nemo!", produced by JPEGMafia and Buzzy Lee.

Notes
 All tracks are stylised in all caps. For example, "Trust!" is stylized as "TRUST!"
 On the offline version, the following things are different from the online release on streaming services:
 "Bald!", "Bald! Remix" and "Cutie Pie!" are excluded from the track listing.
 "Hazard Duty Pay!", "God Don't Like Ugly!", "💯", "Dikembe!", "Untitled" are added to the track listing.
 "Kissy, Face Emoji!" is listed as "🔥", "What Kind of Rappin' Is This?" is listed as "What Kinda Rappin' Is This?", and "Sick, Nervous & Broke!" is listed as "Tired, Nervous & Broke!".
 "End Credits!" has been sped up, changing its length from 1:55 to 1:47.
 "What Kinda Rappin' Is This?" has been extended, changing its length from 1:52 to 3:08.
 "End Credits" contains a sample of retired professional wrestler Arn Anderson cutting a promo on Cody Rhodes during an episode of AEW Dynamite on September 29, 2021.
 "Thot's Prayer" contains an interpolation of "...Baby One More Time" by Britney Spears.
 "Bald!" and "Bald! Remix" contain samples of "Move Me" by Kohta Takahashi (from the soundtrack of the racing video game R4: Ridge Racer Type 4).

Offline! 
The tracks included on the "offline" version were officially added to streaming services in the form of an EP, titled Offline! on February 24, 2022.

All tracks written and produced by JPEGMafia.Notes
 All tracks are stylised in all caps. For example, "Hazard Duty Pay!" is stylized as "HAZARD DUTY PAY!"
 "💯" is listed as "100 Emoji!"

Personnel
Credits adapted from digital booklet.
 JPEGMafia – production, songwriting, mixing, mastering (all tracks), piano 
 DatPiffMafia – featured vocals, songwriting 
 Tkay Maidza – featured vocals, songwriting 
 Denzel Curry – featured vocals, songwriting 
 Alex Goose – sample replay 
 Buzzy Lee – additional production 
 Kimbra – additional vocals

Charts

References

2021 albums
Albums recorded in a home studio
JPEGMafia albums
Mass media about Internet culture
Albums produced by JPEGMafia
Republic Records albums